Blue Mesa may refer to:
 Blue Mesa Dam, an earthfill dam on the Gunnison River in Colorado
 Blue Mesa Reservoir, the largest body of water entirely in Colorado
 Blue Mesa (album), a 1989 album by Peter Ostroushko